Cryptocurrency in Nigeria describes the extent of cryptocurrency use, social acceptance and regulation in Nigeria.

Nigerians are one of the major global users of cryptocurrencies.

Prevalence
The most traded pair is Bitcoin/Naira, and other cryptocurrencies popular in Nigeria include Dash and Ripple.

With a total cryptocurrency transaction volume amounting to $400M, Nigeria ranks third after the United States and Russia according to 2020 estimates.

According to a 2020 online survey, 32% of participating Nigerians used cryptocurrencies.

At least as of late 2020, cryptocurrencies in Nigeria are a parallel and smaller system to the official Naira which the public still assigns importance to as the official currency. Researchers at the Central Bank of Nigeria suggest that rather than threatening the importance of the Naira,

Perception
Bitcoin was initially looked upon with scepticism and associated with ponzi schemes such as Bitconnect, OneCoin and Mavrodi Mudial Moneybox (MMM). Scams were commonplace in Nigeria and Bitcoin was often used as a tool for the victims of the scams to make payments as such Bitcoin was not separated in the perception of the people from these scams. Over time, these negative associations lessened due to factors that promoted the use of bitcoin and cryptocurrencies.

Factors that promote use
The official exchange rate in Nigeria of the Naira to foreign currencies is set by the Nigerian Central Bank, and thus not by forex markets. The central bank tends to devalue the Naira against other currencies. This devaluation is a factor that causes Nigerians to look elsewhere to preserve the value of the money they earn. In 2020 the Central Bank of Nigeria decreased the value of the Naira by 24%.

Transferring money from and to Nigeria is very costly using the traditional banking system, and cryptocurrency provides an alternative to the high fees experienced there.

Following the freezing of bank accounts for cryptocurrency-related activities, many Nigerians have said they will continue to use cryptocurrencies where they can and that they will switch to using peer-to-peer transactions these bypass traditional banks entirely because cryptocurrencies are sent from one person decentralised wallet to another.

Similarly, people have had their bank accounts blocked by authorities for participation in the End SARS anti-police brutality protests, leading to increased use of digital currencies with bitcoin trending on Twitter at the time of the protests.

Legality
The Central Bank of Nigeria Act 2007 gives the central bank, Central Bank of Nigeria (CBN) the right to issue Nigeria's legal tender which is legally prescribed to be the Naira. The act also gives the CBN the sole right to issue Naira and the right to determine the exchange rate of Naira to other fiat currencies. At the time the laws were passed, cryptocurrencies did not exist and thus there is no legal framework addressing cryptocurrencies, nor can they be considered legal tender according to existing laws. 

In 2016 the Nigeria Deposit Insurance Commission (NDIC) and the CBN set up a commission to look into Bitcoin after it became a relevant topic following the shutdown of the ponzi scheme, Mavrodi Mudial Moneybox (MMM) that was active in Nigeria. MMM had announced it would be adopting Bitcoin.

In January 2017 the Securities and Exchange Commission (SEC) issued a warning that no companies or entities involved with cryptocurrencies are recognised or authorised and that there are no protections or insurances against financial losses involving cryptocurrencies. The CBN issued banks with the instruction that they ensure that they do not hold, transact, or in any way use virtual currencies and that customers of those banks that are virtual currency exchanges ensure that they have anti-money laundering regulations in place and otherwise terminate their relationship with those customers and report they are suspicious transactions to the Nigerian Financial Intelligence Unit.

In 2017 the CBN banned banks from facilitating transactions that were cryptocurrency-related, however, this ban was not heavily enforced. Moreover, the CBN and SEC tried to place a ban on cryptocurrencies, but have not done so.

According to members of the research department at the Central Bank of Nigeria, the warnings by the CBN and SEC are designed more as a means to educate the citizens of Nigeria about cryptocurrencies and make sure that they understand that cryptocurrencies are not guaranteed by the state unlike the CBN issued Naira which is.

On the 7 February 2021 statement, the CBN cited its need to protect the public from threats by unregulated activities that are potential areas of illegal operations.

In 2021 Nigerians reportedly had their bank accounts frozen due to being involved in activities with cryptocurrencies.

Cryptocurrency-related companies are not forbidden in Nigeria. The legal status of cryptocurrencies in Nigeria is ambiguous, unlike other countries where there is a clear ban. 

According to a study by price tracker CoinGecko, Nigeria became more interested in cryptocurrencies than any other country in Africa. Nigeria scored 371 in the study that looked at Google Trends data for six searches such as "buy crypto" or "invest in crypto".

Impact
In addition to discussing the impact on Monetary and Fiscal Policy, researchers at the CBN suggest that cryptocurrencies could have a positive effect on the agricultural and education sectors in Nigeria. In the agricultural sector, they suggest that blockchains have a significant potential to enhance access to finance by connecting the technology to their business model which can remedy food security issues. In the education sector, they see cryptocurrencies as being an opportunity as there is much to learn about them and by incorporation of cryptocurrency into education it will be overall beneficial to the development of the country.

References

Notes

Citations

Bibliography

Cryptocurrencies